Colwall railway station is a railway station on the Cotswold Line serving the village of Colwall in Herefordshire, England. The station has one platform with seating. There is no ticket office; a passenger-operated Permit to Travel machine is installed, and there has been a ticket machine (for use with credit and debit cards only) since 2015.

The station was opened in 1861, the same year as the Hereford and Worcester Railway Line.

Today services are available direct to London Paddington, Birmingham and Hereford. To the west lies Ledbury Tunnel and to the east, the Colwall Tunnels.

The station is close to the Colwall Park Hotel and the (now defunct) Malvern Water bottling plant.

Services

As this station has a short platform, passengers can only alight at Colwall from the front 4 carriages of the train.

References

Further reading

External links

Railway stations in Herefordshire
DfT Category F2 stations
Former Great Western Railway stations
Railway stations in Great Britain opened in 1861
Railway stations served by Great Western Railway
Railway stations served by West Midlands Trains
1861 establishments in England